100 Rifles is a 1969 American Western film directed by Tom Gries and starring Jim Brown, Raquel Welch and Burt Reynolds. It is based on Robert MacLeod's 1966 novel The Californio. The film was shot in Spain. The original music score was composed by Jerry Goldsmith, who had previously also scored Bandolero!, another western starring Welch.

Plot
In 1912 Sonora, Mexico, Arizona lawman Lyedecker chases Yaqui Joe, a half-Yaqui, half-white bank robber who has stolen $6,000. Both men are captured by the Mexican general Verdugo.

Lyedecker learns that Joe used the loot to buy 100 rifles for the Yaqui people, who are being repressed by the government. Lyedecker is not interested in Joe's motive, and intends to recover the money and apprehend Joe to further his career.

The two men escape a Mexican firing squad and flee to the hills, where they are joined by Sarita, a beautiful Indian revolutionary. Sarita has a vendetta against the soldiers, who murdered her father. The fugitives become allies. The soldiers raid and burn a village that the rebels have just left, taking its children as hostages. Sarita tells Lydecker that she will allow him to take Yaqui Joe with him back to Phoenix afterwards if he stays with them to help rescue the children. She later warms up to Lyedecker and they make love.

Leading the Yaqui against Verdugo's forces, they ambush and derail the General's train and overcome his soldiers in an extended firefight. Sarita is killed in the battle. Lyedecker decides to return home alone and allow Yaqui Joe to take over as the rebel leader.

Cast
 Jim Brown as Sheriff Lyedecker
 Raquel Welch as Sarita
 Burt Reynolds as Joe "Yaqui Joe" Herrera
 Fernando Lamas as General Verdugo
 Dan O'Herlihy as Steven Grimes, the railroad rep.
 Eric Braeden as Lieutenant Franz Von Klemme (Hans Gudegast)
 Michael Forest as Humara
 Aldo Sambrell as Sergeant Paletes
 Soledad Miranda as prostitute in hotel
 Alberto Dalbés as Padre Francisco (Alberto Dalbes)
 Charly Bravo as Lopez (Carlos Bravo)
 José Manuel Martín as Sarita's Father (Jose Manuel Martin)
 Akim Tamiroff as General Romero (scenes deleted)
 Sancho Gracia as Mexican Leader (uncredited)
 Lorenzo Lamas as Indian Boy (uncredited)

Production

Development
The film was the first of a four-picture deal producer Martin Schwartz had with 20th Century Fox. It was based on a novel by Robert McLeod. The script was originally written by Clair Huffaker.

Tom Gries signed to direct following his successful feature debut with Will Penny. Gries wrote two further drafts of the script himself. "He says he's not a carpenter", reported the Los Angeles Times. "He says he can't work with a script that he doesn't believe in himself." Huffaker later requested his name be taken off the credits and replaced with a pseudonym, "Cecil Hanson", because "the finished product... bears absolutely no resemblance to my original script." However, Huffaker's name does appear in the film's credits.

Casting
The leads were given to Raquel Welch (Gries: "in some situations, this woman is just a piece of candy but I think she will prove in this film that she can act as well"), Jim Brown ("he's a great actor with a lot of appeal", said Gries), and Burt Reynolds.

"I'd like to bring a style to the screen that means something to the cats out on the street", said Brown. "It's an image I want to portray of a strong black man in breaking down social taboos. In 100 Rifles... it's a different thing for a black man to be a lawman, get the woman and ride away into the sunset."

It was the fifth film Burt Reynolds had made in a row. The first four – Shark!, Fade In, Impasse and Whiskey Renegades – had not been released when 100 Rifles was being shot.

Shooting
"I was playing Yaqui Joe, supposedly an Indian with a moustache", said Reynolds. "Raquel had a Spanish accent that sounded like a cross between Carmen Miranda and ZaSu Pitts. Jimmy Brown was afraid of only two things in the entire world: one was heights, the other was horses. And he was on a horse fighting me on a cliff. It just didn't work."

The film was shot in Almería, Spain, in order to save money. "It's a tough, physical picture", says Gries, who was hospitalised for three days during the shoot when he came down with typhus.

"I play a half breed but... I send it up", said Reynolds. "I make it seem like the other 'half' of the guy is from Alabama. I play it nasty, dirty, funky. I look like a Christmas tree – wrist bands, arm bands. At the beginning I even wore these funky spurs. But every time I walked I couldn't hear dialog."

There were a number of press reports that Brown and Welch clashed during filming. Brown later said:
The thing I wanted to avoid most was any suggestion that I was coming on to her. So I withdrew. If I'd tried to socialise, we'd have had problems.  You know, Raquel is married too and out of respect for her husband I wanted to deal with Raquel through him... She was so suspicious and concerned that we were there to steal something away, or something. You can get very hung up on who's going to get the close ups and so on... [Burt Reynolds] was usually a stabilising influence [between the stars]... He's a heck of a cat. He had various talks with Raquel and tried to assure her that nothing was going on, that we weren't trying to steal anything.
Welch later confirmed the tension:
It was an atmosphere. And it was really, in all seriousness, as ambiguous as hell. I don't know why it happened and I don't think Jimmy knows why it happened... My attitude on a film has always been, once it goes I'm interested only in my job. I'm not interested in asserting myself on a picture. Because it means too much to me.
"I spent the entire time refereeing fights between Jim Brown and Raquel Welch", said Reynolds. He elaborated:
It started because they were kind of attracted to each other. After a while they both displayed a little temperament, but don't forget we were out in the middle of the bloody desert with the temperature at 110. Of course, I don't think they'll ever work together again. The critics have really been knocking those two – murdering them – but as far as I know no one ever said they were Lunt and Fontanne. Jim is the most honest man I know... And Raquel – one of the gutsiest broads I know, physically. She did all her own stunts. There's also a performance in there somewhere.
Raquel Welch later said she "was the baloney in a cheesecake factory" on that film. "I wanted to keep up with all the action with the boys." She was sorry Tom Gries "wanted to get all the sex scenes (with Jim Brown) in the can in the first day. There was no time for icing – and it made it difficult for me." She says Brown "was very forceful and I am feisty. I was a little uncomfortable with too much male aggression. But – it turned out to be great exploitation for the film, now as you look back. It broke new ground."

Reception

Box office
The film opened on 26 March 1969 and grossed $301,315 in its first 5 days from nine cities.

According to Fox records the film required $8,225,000 in rentals to break even and by 11 December 1970 had made $6,900,000 so made a loss to the studio.

Critical response
On review aggregator Rotten Tomatoes, the film has two reviews, with an average rating of 4/10.

Quentin Tarantino said the "mediocre final product still seems like a shamefully wasted opportunity (I mean Jesus Christ, how do you fuck up a movie starring Jim Brown, Burt Reynolds and Raquel Welch?)."

See also
 List of American films of 1969

References

External links
 
 
 
 
 
 100 Rifles at DBCult Film Institute
 Review of film at New York Times

1969 films
1960s English-language films
1969 Western (genre) films
20th Century Fox films
African-American drama films
African-American Western (genre) films
Films about interracial romance
Films about Native Americans
Films based on American novels
Films based on Western (genre) novels
Films directed by Tom Gries
Films scored by Jerry Goldsmith
Films set in 1912
Films set in Mexico
Films shot in Almería
Mexican Revolution films
1969 drama films
1960s American films